Anubhav is a Bollywood film released on 5 June 2009 starring Sanjay Suri in the title role.

Cast

Critical reception 

Movie was well received

Release 
The Times of India gave the film two out of five stars and stated that "The only thing that holds the film together is a fine act by Sanjay Suri who tries to invest some dignity in this film that borders on the crude".

References

External links
 

2000s Hindi-language films
Films directed by Rajeevnath